Edimílson dos Santos Carmo Júnior (born 15 October 1987 in Santos), simply known as Edimílson, is a Brazilian retired footballer who played as an attacking midfielder.

Honours
Santos
Campeonato Paulista: 2006

Sport Recife
Campeonato Pernambucano: 2007

References

External links

meusport
sportnet
Pandurii Târgu Jiu 2007–2008 squad at RomanianSoccer

1987 births
Living people
Brazilian footballers
Brazilian expatriate footballers
Santos FC players
Guarani FC players
Sport Club do Recife players
CS Pandurii Târgu Jiu players
C.F. Os Belenenses players
Oeste Futebol Clube players
Grêmio Barueri Futebol players
FC Mika players
América Futebol Clube (RN) players
Liga I players
Liga Portugal 2 players
Armenian Premier League players
Kategoria Superiore players
Kategoria e Parë players
Campeonato Brasileiro Série A players
Campeonato Brasileiro Série B players
Association football midfielders
Expatriate footballers in Portugal
Expatriate footballers in Romania
Expatriate footballers in Albania
Expatriate footballers in Armenia
Brazilian expatriate sportspeople in Portugal
Brazilian expatriate sportspeople in Romania
Brazilian expatriate sportspeople in Albania